General elections were held in Liberia in May 1865. The result of the presidential election was a victory for incumbent President Daniel Bashiel Warner of the Republican Party.

References

Liberia
1865 in Liberia
Elections in Liberia
Election and referendum articles with incomplete results